Footloose was a professional wrestling tag team consisting of Toshiaki Kawada and Ricky/Samson Fuyuki.

Career
Toshiaki Kawada and Samson Fuyuki started teaming up in 1985, while on an excursion in San Antonio, wrestling for Texas All-Star Wrestling. Kawada and Fuyuki, who by then went under the name Ricky Fuyuki, went under the team name Japanese Force and they feuded with American Force (Paul Diamond and Shawn Michaels). They were managed by Gary Hart.

In 1987, Kawada and Fuyuki, now going by the name Samson Fuyuki, joined Genichiro Tenryu's Revolution. In January 1988, they began wearing matching ring attire and named their team Footloose.

On March 9, 1988, Footloose won the All Asia Tag Team Championship, defeating Mighty Inoue and Takashi Ishikawa. They would hold the titles for exactly six months before losing the belts to Shinichi Nakano and Shunji Takano on September 9, 1988. However, Footloose rebounded by defeating Nakano and Takano to reclaim the titles six days later, on September 15, 1988.

After the feud with Nakano and Takano died down, Footloose went into a heated rivalry with The Can-Am Express (Doug Furnas and Dan Kroffat). On June 5, 1989, Furnas and Kroffat defeated them for the All Asia Tag Team titles. Four months later, on October 20, 1989, Footloose defeated the Express to win back the titles for the third time. Their third reign would be their last, before losing the titles back to the Express on March 2, 1990.

Soon after the title loss in April 1990, Footloose disbanded, as Kawada would form a team with friend Tiger Mask II, who would later unmask, revealing himself as Mitsuharu Misawa. Fuyuki followed Tenryu into the new Super World of Sports promotion.

On October 27, 2001, Kawada defeated Fuyuki in a singles match in AJPW.

The New Footloose
In 1998, Samson (now Kodo) Fuyuki formed The New Footloose with Yukihiro Kanemura in Frontier Martial-Arts Wrestling.

Championships and accomplishments
All Japan Pro Wrestling
All Asia Tag Team Championship (3 times)

All Japan Pro Wrestling teams and stables
Frontier Martial-Arts Wrestling teams and stables